School of the Air is a generic term for correspondence schools catering for the primary and early secondary education of children in remote and outback Australia where some or all classes were historically conducted by radio, although this is now replaced by telephone and internet technology. In these areas, the school-age population is too small for a conventional school to be viable.

History
The invention of the pedal radio by Alfred Traeger around 1929,
and particularly the involvement of educator Adelaide Miethke in formulating and developing the idea of using the existing Royal Flying Doctor Service of radio communications, were pivotal in the establishment of the School of the Air.

The first School of the Air lessons were officially sent from the Royal Flying Doctor Service in Alice Springs on 8 June 1951. The service celebrated its 50th jubilee on 9 May 2001, ahead of the real jubilee on 8 June; and its 70th year on 8 June 2021. Each state of Australia that utilises this means of training has well-documented checks and overviews of the service.

Method
There are School of the Air programmes in all states except Tasmania.

School classes were conducted via shortwave radio from 1951 until 2009, after which most schools switched to wireless internet technologies to deliver lessons that include live one-way video feeds and clear two-way audio.

Each student has direct contact with a teacher in an inland town such as Broken Hill, Alice Springs or Meekatharra. Each student typically spends one hour per day receiving group or individual lessons from the teacher, and the rest of the day working through the assigned materials with a parent, older sibling or a hired home-stay tutor.

Originally the students received their course materials and returned their written work and projects to their hub centre using either the Royal Flying Doctor Service or post office services. However the extension of Internet services into the outback now enables more rapid review of each child's homework.

As the children are in isolated situations, the School of the Air is frequently their first chance of socialisation with children outside their immediate family. This is supplemented by 3 or 4 annual gatherings where the children travel to the school to spend one week with their teacher and classmates.

Studies have shown that such education is on par with, if not better than, standards set by the traditional methods of schooling.

Awards 
In 2009 as part of the Q150 celebrations, the School of the Air was announced as one of the Q150 Icons of Queensland for its role as an iconic "innovation and invention".

Schools of the Air
Schools of the Air operate from:

New South Wales 

Broken Hill
Tibooburra

Northern Territory 

Alice Springs
Katherine

Queensland 

Cairns
Charleville
Charters Towers
Longreach
Mount Isa

South Australia

Port Augusta – now part of Open Access College

Victoria 

 Thornbury

Western Australia 

Carnarvon
Kalgoorlie
Kimberley region, located in Derby
Meekatharra
Port Hedland

See also
Alice Springs School of the Air
School of Isolated and Distance Education
Educational School Sound System was a common installation in South Australia.
Our Rural Magazine, an example of an earlier pre-radio forms of distant education communication in Western Australia
Queensland School for Travelling Show Children discusses schooling for children whose families are constantly travelling.
Homeschooling and distance education in Australia discusses home schooling by choice.

Notes

External links
 

School types
Education in Australia
1951 establishments in Australia
Educational institutions established in 1951
1951 introductions